Jerome Merle Ceppos (October 14, 1946 – July 29, 2022) was an American journalist, news executive, and educator.  

He is recognized as the former top editor of San Jose Mercury News and the Dean of the Manship School of Mass Communication at Louisiana State University. With 50 years of experience as a journalist, he was awarded with a recognition from the Society of Professional Journalists for his consistently high ethical standards.

Early life 
Ceppos was born in Washington, DC and grew up in Silver Spring, Maryland.  He attended Northwood High School where he edited The Red and Black school newspaper.  At the University of Maryland he edited The Diamondback and graduated in 1969 with a BA in journalism. He joined SDX, now the Society of Professional Journalists, and was inducted into Omicron Delta Kappa, men's leadership society.

Career

Gannett 
Ceppos's first full-time professional position was at the Rochester Democrat and Chronicle, where he was reporter, assistant city editor, and night city editor between 1969 and 1972.

Knight-Ridder 
In 1972 he moved to the Miami Herald, where he was assistant city editor, their first national foreign editor, and assistant managing editor for news before moving to the San Jose Mercury News in 1981.  There he was associate editor, managing editor, senior vice president and executive editor.  While managing editor, the newspaper won two Pulitzer Prizes. He also initiated a Vietnamese edition Viet Mercury and a Spanish edition Nuevo Mundo.  He supported digital initiatives at a print journalism company and successfully championed diversity hiring.  In 1999 he became vice president for News of Knight-Ridder, then the second largest newspaper chain in the United States. He left the position in 2005.

University of Nevada – Reno 
From 2008 to 2011, he was dean and professor at the Reynolds School in Journalism at the University of Nevada-Reno, holding the Fred W. Smith Chair in Journalism. As incoming dean, he commissioned a large banner with the words of the First Amendment to hang in the school.  He continued his professional goals by increasing diversity hiring and changing the curriculum to require cross-platform training for all students.

Louisiana State University 
In July 2011 he became dean and William B. Dickinson Distinguished Professor at the Manship School of Mass Communication at Louisiana State University.  He repeated his display of the First Amendment and moved the curriculum toward online media.  He taught media ethics.  He stepped down as dean at the end of the 2017–2018 academic year.  He continued to teach "Media Writing," "Media Management," and "Media Ethics and Social Responsibility." He died at his home in Baton Rouge on July 29, 2022. "

Other work 
Ceppos was consultant with Leading Edge Associates, a management consulting firm in San Jose from 2006 to 2009.  In 2007 he was Fellow in media ethics at the Markkula Center for Applied Ethics at Santa Clara University.

Controversies

Dark alliance 
Gary Webb was a reporter for The Mercury News.  Hired in 1987, his year-long investigation of cocaine dealing in Los Angeles was published in The Mercury News in three parts, from August 18–20, 1996 as "Dark Alliance." Jerry Ceppos was executive editor of the newspaper. Plaudits for the story were followed by criticism from major media outlets such as the New York Times, Washington Post, and Los Angeles Times.  After initially defending the story, Ceppos commissioned an internal review. At the end of March 1997, Ceppos told Webb that he was going to present the internal review findings in a column. After discussions with Webb, the column was published on May 11, 1997.

Ceppos took personal responsibility for the series and its flaws in his opening sentence, "Few things in life are harder than owning up to one's shortcomings, but I need to tell you about an important case in which I believe that we fell short of my standards for the Mercury News." In the column Ceppos continued to defend parts of the article, writing that the series had "solidly documented" that the drug ring described in the series did have connections with the Contras and did sell large quantities of cocaine in inner-city Los Angeles. But, Ceppos wrote, the series "did not meet our standards" in four areas. 1) It presented only one interpretation of conflicting evidence and in one case "did not include information that contradicted a central assertion of the series." 2) The series' estimates of the money involved was presented as fact instead of an estimate. 3) The series oversimplified how the crack epidemic grew. 4) The series "created impressions that were open to misinterpretation" through "imprecise language and graphics."

Ceppos noted that Webb did not agree with these conclusions. He concluded: "How did these shortcomings occur? ... I believe that we fell short at every step of our process: in the writing, editing and production of our work. Several people here share that burden ... But ultimately, the responsibility was, and is, mine." [See "Dark Alliance" in CIA involvement in Contra cocaine trafficking]

Ceppos's mea culpa won praise in the journalism profession.  He was awarded, along with two others, the first  Ethics in Journalism award from the Society of Professional Journalists for "superior ethical conduct."  Critics suggested he had caved to outside pressure, including that of the government and its agencies.

The 2014 film Kill the Messenger was based upon the controversy. Canadian-born American actor Oliver Platt played Jerry Ceppos. Opinions about the movie paralleled those about the original story. Additionally, there was controversy as to whether Ceppos had been contacted or not regarding the factual aspects of the movie.

Webb was found dead in his Carmichael home on December 10, 2004, with two gunshot wounds to the head. His death was ruled a suicide by the Sacramento County coroner's office.

Pre-publication review 
In August 1998 a financial story by Chris Schmitt was shared in its entirety with NASDAQ  for fact-checking prior to publication.  Changes were made prior to publication. This departure from standard journalism practice raised ethical questions regarding the relationship between journalists and the subjects they cover, who are not assumed to have control over the content of publication.

Media

Publications 
 Jerry Ceppos, "Hope to be found in optimism of the young," The.Advocate.Com,  April 6, 2020.
 Jerry Ceppos, John Maxwell, and Martin Johnson. "How journalists can win back Americans' trust," mercurynews.com, August 24, 2018.
 Jerry Ceppos, John Maxwell, and Martin Johnson. "How journalists can win back Americans' trust," eastbaytimes.com, August 24, 2018.
 Jerry Ceppos, "Chapter Four: How We Got Here and What It Means for New Orleans News Consumers,"  News Evolution or Revolution?: The Future of Print Journalism in the Digital Age by Andrea Miller and Amy Reynolds,  (Peter Lang Publishing Inc., 2014). 
 Jerry Ceppos, "Foreword," Moral Reasoning for Journalists, by Steve Knowlton and Bill Reader, 2nd revised edition, 2009.
 Arthur S. Hayes,  Jane B. Singer and Jerry Ceppos, “Shifting Roles, Enduring Values: The Credible Journalist in a Digital Age,” Journal of Mass Media Ethics, 22:(4), 262–279, 2007.
 Jerry Ceppos, "A plea from minority journalists: give us some feedback." American Journalism Review, vol. 16, no. 7, 1994, p. 16+. Gale Academic OneFile, Accessed 8 June 2020.

Electronic media 
 Ceppos: Post-Deanship. May 20, 2018.
 Words of Encouragement from Former Dean Jerry Ceppos, March 28, 2020.
 Celebrating Dean Jerry Ceppos. May 11, 2018.
 Manship Minute: Jerry Ceppos, March 12, 2018.
 WRKF. June 20, 2017.
 Dean Ceppos Portrayed in New Film "Kill the Messenger, October 11, 2014.
 KLSU Bracket Challenge, March 19, 2014.
 Jerry Ceppos on J-School. September 7, 2011.
 The 1964 Daisy Girl Advertisement. C-SPAN. April 6, October 24, 2011.
 The Daily Reveille: Interview with Jerry Ceppos. August 24, 2011.
 Fairness in Journalism, American Society of Newspaper Editors. C-SPAN. April 6, 2001.
 Media Credibility, American Society of Newspaper Editors. C-SPAN. April 1, 1998.

Memberships and honors 
 Advisory Board, LSU Museum
 Member and Past President, Accrediting Council on Education in Journalism and Mass Communications
 Fellow, Society of Professional Journalists, 2016
 Judge, Scripps-Howard Foundation Awards, 2016
 Judge, Katherine Schneider Journalism Award for Excellence in Reporting on Disability, 2013–2019
 Advisory Board, National Center on Disability in Journalism, 2013–2019
 Recipient, Carr Van Anda Award for Enduring Contributions to Journalism, Ohio University, 2006
 Judge, ASNE Awards, 2004, 2005
 Recipient, ASJMC Gerald M. Sass Distinguished Service Award, 2002
 President, Associated Press Managing Editors, 2000
 Recipient, Ethics in Journalism Award, Society of Professional Journalists, 1997
 Recipient, Anti-Defamation League Torch of Liberty Award, 1997
 Juror, Pulitzer Prize, 1997
 Former Member, Board of Visitors, Philip Merrill College of Journalism, University of Maryland

See also 
 CIA involvement in Contra cocaine trafficking
 Knight Ridder

References

External links 
 Kill the Messenger official website
 Howard. Finberg, "Journalism professionals, academics debate the value of research," poynter.org, June 27, 2012.
 Manship School of Mass Communication
 Miami Herald
 Reynolds School of Journalism
 The Mercury News

1946 births
2022 deaths
American newspaper editors
American newspaper reporters and correspondents
University System of Maryland alumni
Writers from Washington, D.C.